Amirovo (Ämir) is a rural locality (a village) in Maysky Selsoviet, Iglinsky District, Bashkortostan, Russia. The population was 26 as of 2010. There is 1 street.

Geography 
Amirovo is located 61 km east of Iglino (the district's administrative centre) by road. Maysky is the nearest rural locality.

References 

Rural localities in Iglinsky District